was a Japanese actress, and the wife of Japanese filmmaker Akira Kurosawa for 39 years. She had two children with Kurosawa: a son named Hisao and a daughter named Kazuko.

Personal life 
While working on Akira Kurosawa's second film, The Most Beautiful, Yaguchi clashed over the alleged ways the director treated the actors. However, the pair found a connection, despite these clashes, and married in 1945. Their son Hisao was born that same year.

Partial filmography 

 Renga joko (1940)
 Enoken no songokū: songokū zenko-hen (Enoken's Sun Wukong) (1940)
 Jogakusei-ki (1941)
 The Most Beautiful (1944)

References

External links

New York Times

1921 births
1985 deaths
20th-century Japanese actresses
Akira Kurosawa